Crane School may refer to:

 Crane Country Day School, K-8 private school in Santa Barbara, CA, USA
 Crane School of Music, music school in Potsdam, NY, USA
Crane Theological School at Tufts University, USA, 1869-1968

See also
Crane High School (disambiguation)
Crane School District (disambiguation)